Thomas Hall (4 September 1891 – after 1926) was an English footballer who played professionally as an inside forward for Sunderland, Newcastle United and Gillingham, for whom he made 190 Football League appearances. He retired in 1926 to become the Kent club's trainer.

References

1891 births
Year of death missing
People from Newburn
Footballers from Tyne and Wear
English footballers
Association football inside forwards
Sunderland A.F.C. players
Newcastle United F.C. players
Gillingham F.C. players
English Football League players